Arkhangelskoye is a rural locality (a selo) in Tabynsky Selsoviet, Gafuriysky District, Bashkortostan, Russia. The population was 145 as of 2010. There are 3 streets.

Geography 
Arkhangelskoye is located 24 km north of Krasnousolsky (the district's administrative centre) by road. Akhmetka is the nearest rural locality.

References 

Rural localities in Gafuriysky District